Carroll Edward Cole (May 9, 1938 – December 6, 1985) was an American serial killer who was executed in 1985 for killing at least fifteen women and one boy by strangulation between 1947 and 1980. He confessed to a total of 35 murders.

Early life
Carroll Cole was born in Sioux City, Iowa, the second son of LaVerne Cole (May 25, 1900 – February 5, 1975)  and Vesta Cole (September 4, 1904 – January 27, 1984). His younger sister was born in 1939 and soon afterwards, his family moved to California, where LaVerne found work in a shipyard. Not long after that, LaVerne went to fight in World War II. While his father was away, his mother had several affairs and sometimes took Cole along to her rendezvous, threatening to beat him if he told his father. Vesta was emotionally abusive to Cole and dressed him as a girl. At school, he was teased about his "girl's name" by his peers.

First murder
At age 8, he retaliated against one of his classmates, a boy of the same age named Duane, by drowning him in a lake in Richmond, California. The death was regarded an accident by authorities, until Cole confessed to it many years later in an autobiography he wrote in prison. During a press interview Cole said of this event, "I was primed, I had made the mental commitment I was going to get even with my mother, and things just built up and built up and became an obsession."

As a teen, Cole committed several petty crimes and was frequently arrested for drunkenness and minor thefts. After high school, he joined the U.S. Army, but was given a bad-conduct discharge in 1958 for stealing pistols. In 1960, Cole attacked two couples parked in cars on a lover's lane. Soon afterwards, he called the police in Richmond, California, where he was living, and told them that he was plagued by violent fantasies involving strangling women.

Later life
Cole spent time in various mental hospitals over the next three years. At the last of them, Stockton State Hospital, a Dr. Weiss wrote: "He seems to be afraid of the female figure and cannot have intercourse with her first but must kill her before he can do it." Weiss approved his release in April 1963, despite hospital staff having diagnosed Cole with antisocial personality disorder.

Upon his release, Cole moved to Dallas, Texas, where his brother Richard was living. There, he met and married an alcoholic stripper named Billie Whitworth, though this didn't change his perspective towards women. After two years, the marriage ended when Cole burned down a motel after convincing himself that Whitworth was having sex with men there. As a result, he was arrested for arson. Upon his release from prison, Cole attempted to strangle an 11-year-old girl in Missouri. He was arrested and sentenced to five years in prison.

After the sentence was up, Cole ended up in Nevada, where he attempted to strangle two more women. Once again, he checked himself into a mental hospital. The doctors there noted his murderous fantasies but still elected not to detain him and he was given a ticket back to San Diego.

Serial murders
Cole's first victim as an adult was Essie L. Buckley, whom he had picked up in a San Diego tavern on May 7, 1971. He strangled her to death in his car and drove around with her body in the trunk before eventually dumping it. Just two weeks later, he killed an unidentified woman and buried her in a wooded area. He later claimed that they had proven themselves unfaithful to their husbands, and so reminded him of his adulterous mother.

In July 1973, Cole married barmaid Diana Faye Younglove Pashal, who was also an alcoholic. They argued and fought frequently, and Cole regularly went off on his own for days at a time. He would commit murders while he was away, including one woman he allegedly cannibalized to a degree. In September 1979, Cole strangled Pashal to death. A suspicious neighbor called the police eight days later, but although they found Pashal's body wrapped in a blanket and stuffed in a closet, they decided that she had died because of her heavy drinking, and Cole was released without charge after questioning.

Cole left San Diego and started moving around again. In 1979, Cole met Marie Cushman at a bar in Las Vegas. That same evening, the two went to a motel where they had sex, he then killed her by strangulation.

Following the Las Vegas killing, he returned to Dallas, where he fatally strangled three more women in November 1980. Cole was a suspect in the second of these killings and was also found on the scene of the third murder. He was arrested and held in custody. The police then came to the conclusion that the victim had probably died of natural causes, and Cole was about to be ruled out as a suspect before he confessed to, along with this murder, all of the other killings. Cole claimed that he had murdered at least fourteen women over the previous nine years, although he added that there may have been more and he couldn't remember exactly, as he was usually drunk when he committed his crimes.

Conviction and death
On April 9, 1981, Cole was convicted of three of the murders committed in Texas. He was sentenced to life at the Huntsville Prison. In 1984, Cole's mother died and his attitude was reported to have changed. He agreed to face further murder charges filed in Nevada, even though it could possibly mean the death penalty.

In February 1984, Cole was extradited to Nevada, where he was tried and convicted for the strangulation deaths of two women in 1977 and 1979.  In October 1984, Cole was sentenced to death in Nevada. When his sentencing was passed he said, "Thanks, Judge." Anti-death penalty campaigners, including the American Civil Liberties Union (ACLU) tried to have his sentence commuted, but Cole protested.  Cole was executed by lethal injection at Nevada State Prison on December 6, 1985.

See also
 List of people executed in Nevada
 List of serial killers by number of victims
 List of serial killers in the United States

References

External links
 Carroll Cole at the Crime Library
 Carroll Cole interview – 1985

1938 births
1985 deaths
1948 murders in the United States
1979 murders in the United States
20th-century executions by Nevada
20th-century executions of American people
American arsonists
American cannibals
American male criminals
American people convicted of burglary
American people convicted of theft
Executed American serial killers
Executed people from Iowa
Male serial killers
Murder committed by minors
People convicted of murder by Nevada
People executed by Nevada by lethal injection
People from Sioux City, Iowa
People with antisocial personality disorder
Uxoricides